Laro is an ethnic group in Sudan. The population of the Laro is at 9 million. Many members of this group are Christians. Their traditional home is the Nuba Hills. They speak Laro, a Niger–Congo language.

References
Joshua Project

Nuba peoples
Ethnic groups in Sudan